Sara Makovec (born 31 March 2000) is a Slovenian footballer who plays as a midfielder for Olimpija Ljubljana and the Slovenia women's national team.

Career
Makovec has been capped for the Slovenia national team, appearing for the team during the 2019 FIFA Women's World Cup qualifying cycle.

References

External links
 
 
 

2000 births
Living people
Slovenian women's footballers
Slovenia women's international footballers
Women's association football midfielders
ŽNK Mura players
ŽNK Olimpija Ljubljana players